Clear Creek Township is one of eleven townships in Monroe County, Indiana, United States. As of the 2010 census, its population was 5,000 and it contained 2,674 housing units.

History
Joseph Mitchell House was listed on the National Register of Historic Places in 1986.

Geography

Unincorporated towns
 Fairfax at 
 Harrodsburg at 
 Smithville at 
(This list is based on USGS data and may include former settlements.)

Monroe County's Clear Creek Town is not located in Clear Creek Township, but rather in Perry Township, just north of Clear Creek Township's border. Both the town and the township are named after the same eponymous creek, which flows from the north to the south through both of them.

Cemeteries
Clear Creek Township Trustee's Office (Township Government) operates three active cemeteries, which includes the marking and selling of plots, marking for headstones, meeting with family members and marking burial sites for their family member, all maintenance, mowing and trimming, filling in grave sites, removing funeral floral arrangements, leveling and sowing grass seed and straw, cleaning up after rain and/or wind storms which blow flowers off grave sites.

Clear Creek Township Trustee's Office (Township Government) has an additional 26 cemeteries in the township. Four cemeteries were moved due to the construction of Lake Monroe.

Deeds are recorded in office of the Recorder of Monroe County. Thelma Kelley Jeffries is the trustee of the township.

Clear Creek Township contains 29 cemeteries.

Major highways
  Indiana State Road 37

School districts
 Monroe County Community School Corporation

Political districts
 Indiana's 9th congressional district
 State House District 60
 State Senate District 44

References
 
 United States Census Bureau 2008 TIGER/Line Shapefiles
 IndianaMap

External links

 Clear Creek Township Government page
 Clear Creek Township Cemeteries page
 Indiana Township Association
 United Township Association of Indiana
 City-Data.com page for Clear Creek Township

Townships in Monroe County, Indiana
Bloomington metropolitan area, Indiana
Townships in Indiana